Pablo Damián Barboza (born 25 April 1996) is an Argentine professional footballer who plays as a midfielder for Sacachispas, on loan from Huracán.

Career
Barboza began with Huracán. He was selected as a substitute twice in 2017, in an Argentine Primera División match with Unión Santa Fe on 16 June and in a Copa Sudamericana tie with Libertad on 11 July, but went unused on both occasions. In July 2018, Barboza joined Sacachispas of Primera B Metropolitana on loan. He made his professional debut on 17 August against Barracas Central, prior to scoring his first senior goal during a defeat to All Boys two weeks later.

Career statistics
.

References

External links

1996 births
Living people
Place of birth missing (living people)
Argentine footballers
Association football midfielders
Argentine Primera División players
Primera B Metropolitana players
Club Atlético Huracán footballers
Sacachispas Fútbol Club players